Aciurina mixteca is a species of tephritid or fruit flies in the genus Aciurina of the family Tephritidae.

Distribution
Mexico.

References

Tephritinae
Insects described in 1994
Diptera of North America